The 2022 Castilian-Leonese regional election was held on Sunday, 13 February 2022, to elect the 11th Cortes of the autonomous community of Castile and León. All 81 seats in the Cortes were up for election. This marks the first time that a regional premier in Castile and León has made use of the presidential prerogative to call an early election.

The previous election had seen a victory for the opposition Spanish Socialist Workers' Party (PSOE) for the first time since 1983, but the ruling People's Party (PP) was able to elect its candidate, Alfonso Fernández Mañueco, as new regional president by forming a coalition with the liberal Citizens (Cs). Despite this arrangement, tensions soon began to emerge between the two governing partners over the management of the COVID-19 pandemic in the region. In March 2021, a PSOE-tabled vote of no confidence was defeated, but it indirectly led to the defection of one Cs legislator to the opposition, leaving the PP–Cs government in minority status. Subsequently, rumours rose on the possibility of Mañueco planning a snap election to be held at some point between the winter of 2021 and the spring of 2022, after having grown tired of the coalition as well as to take advantage of the PP's "honeymoon" in opinion polls following the Madrilenian election in May. On 20 December 2021, Mañueco expelled Cs from his government and called the election for 13 February 2022, catching his coalition partner off-guard, with his (now former) deputy Francisco Igea learning of it during a live interview.

Results on election night were dubbed by most media as a pyrrhic victory for the PP, which failed to materialize early expectations of a landslide win in a historical stronghold, and instead ended up obtaining its worst result ever in both votes and vote share in the region, as well as a very close result with the PSOE, which was able to secure a stronger-than-expected performance, despite losing ground compared to 2019. The vote share for Cs collapsed and the party was barely able to retain Igea's seat in Valladolid but was successful in its primary goal of preventing a total wipeout. The far-right Vox party secured its best result in an autonomous community election in Spain up until that point, with 17.6% of the vote share and 13 seats. Unidas Podemos underperformed opinion polls, whereas regionalist Leonese People's Union (UPL) and For Ávila (XAV) secured their best results to date. Soria Now (SY)—a social platform aligned to the Empty Spain movement—won in the Soria constituency in a landslide. Together, both PP and Vox commanded a majority of 44 out of 81 seats, and formed a coalition government.

Overview

Electoral system
The Cortes of Castile and León were the devolved, unicameral legislature of the autonomous community of Castile and León, having legislative power in regional matters as defined by the Spanish Constitution and the Castilian-Leonese Statute of Autonomy, as well as the ability to vote confidence in or withdraw it from a regional president.

Voting for the Cortes was on the basis of universal suffrage, which comprised all nationals over 18 years of age, registered in Castile and León and in full enjoyment of their political rights. Additionally, Castilian-Leonese people abroad were required to apply for voting before being permitted to vote, a system known as "begged" or expat vote. All members of the Cortes of Castile and León were elected using the D'Hondt method and a closed list proportional representation, with an electoral threshold of three percent of valid votes—which included blank ballots—being applied in each constituency. Seats were allocated to constituencies, corresponding to the provinces of Ávila, Burgos, León, Palencia, Salamanca, Segovia, Soria, Valladolid and Zamora, with each being allocated an initial minimum of three seats, as well as one additional member per each 45,000 inhabitants or fraction greater than 22,500.

As a result of the aforementioned allocation, each constituency was entitled the following seats for the 2022 regional election:

The use of the D'Hondt method might result in a higher effective threshold, depending on the district magnitude.

Election date
The term of the Cortes of Castile and León expired four years after the date of their previous election, unless they were dissolved earlier. The election decree was required to be issued no later than the twenty-fifth day prior to the date of expiry of parliament and published on the following day in the Official Gazette of Castile and León (BOCYL), with election day taking place between the fifty-fourth and sixtieth days from publication. The previous election was held on 26 May 2019, which means that the legislature's term will expire on 26 May 2023. The election decree shall be published in the BOCYL no later than 2 May 2023, with the election taking place up to the sixtieth day from publication, setting the latest possible election date for the Cortes on Saturday, 1 July 2023.

The president had the prerogative to dissolve the Cortes of Castile and León and call a snap election, provided that no motion of no confidence was in process and that dissolution did not occur either during the first legislative session or before one year had elapsed since a previous dissolution. In the event of an investiture process failing to elect a regional president within a two-month period from the first ballot, the Cortes were to be automatically dissolved and a fresh election called.

By 2021, the relationship between the two ruling coalition partners, the People's Party (PP) and Citizens (Cs) had become strained to the point that President Alfonso Fernández Mañueco was considering to call a snap election for late in the year or early 2022, taking advantage of the momentum gained by the PP in opinion polls as a result of its victory in the 2021 Madrilenian regional election. Mañueco was also wary that the Cs internal crisis, which had seen a number of defections from the party, could see a successful motion of no confidence being mounted on him once the PSOE was be able to table a new censure motion in March 2022, one year after a previous, unsuccessful one. In October 2021, it was hinted that Mañueco was considering an election to be held on either 28 November or 12 December, though it later transpired that an election in the spring of 2022 was more likely. Speculation on an early election in Andalusia, coupled with possible snap elections in other regions—such as Aragon or the Valencian Community—initially hinted at a possible simultaneous electoral call, but Andalusian president Juan Manuel Moreno's announcement on 30 November that an election in Andalusia would not be held sooner than June 2022 meant that any prospective Castilian-Leonese snap election would be held earlier. This was finally confirmed on 20 December 2021 when Mañueco announced a snap election for 13 February 2022.

Parliamentary composition
The Cortes of Castile and León was officially dissolved on 21 December 2021, after the publication of the dissolution decree in the Official Gazette of Castile and León. The table below shows the composition of the parliamentary groups in the Cortes at the time of dissolution.

Parties and candidates
The electoral law allows for parties and federations registered in the interior ministry, coalitions and groupings of electors to present lists of candidates. Parties and federations intending to form a coalition ahead of an election are required to inform the relevant Electoral Commission within ten days of the election call, whereas groupings of electors need to secure the signature of at least one percent of the electorate in the constituencies for which they seek election, disallowing electors from signing for more than one list of candidates.

Below is a list of the main parties and electoral alliances which contested the election:

In September 2021, citizen collectives of the so-called "Empty Spain" ( or España Vaciada), a coined term to refer to Spain's rural and largely unpopulated interior provinces, agreed to look for formulas to contest the next elections in Spain, inspired by the success of the Teruel Existe candidacy (Spanish for "Teruel Exists") in the November 2019 general election. By November 2021, it was confirmed that over 160 collectives and associations from about 30 Spanish provinces had committed themselves to finalizing the electoral platform before January 2022, and that it would be ready to contest any snap election in Castile and León. This was confirmed following Mañueco's announcement of the election date for 13 February 2022, with the Soria Now! (Spanish: Soria ¡Ya!), Burgos Roots (Spanish: Burgos Enraíza) platforms confirming their participation. On 27 December, Clean Plateau (Spanish: Meseta Limpia) and Aprodespa announced a candidacy of the Empty Spain in the province of Palencia, with a candidacy for Salamanca being announced the next day, and for Valladolid on 10 January. However, the platform ruled out standing in Ávila, León, Segovia and Zamora.

Timetable
The key dates are listed below (all times are CET):

20 December: The election decree is issued with the countersign of the President.
21 December: Formal dissolution of the Cortes of Castile and León and beginning of a suspension period of events for the inauguration of public works, services or projects.
24 December: Initial constitution of provincial and zone electoral commissions.
31 December: Deadline for parties and federations intending to enter into a coalition to inform the relevant electoral commission.
10 January: Deadline for parties, federations, coalitions, and groupings of electors to present lists of candidates to the relevant electoral commission.
12 January: Submitted lists of candidates are provisionally published in the Official Gazette of Castile and León (BOCyL).
15 January: Deadline for citizens entered in the Register of Absent Electors Residing Abroad (CERA) and for citizens temporarily absent from Spain to apply for voting.
16 January: Deadline for parties, federations, coalitions, and groupings of electors to rectify irregularities in their lists.
17 January: Official proclamation of valid submitted lists of candidates.
18 January: Proclaimed lists are published in the BOCyL.
28 January: Official start of electoral campaigning.
3 February: Deadline to apply for postal voting.
8 February: Official start of legal ban on electoral opinion polling publication, dissemination or reproduction and deadline for CERA citizens to vote by mail.
9 February: Deadline for postal and temporarily absent voters to issue their votes.
11 February: Last day of official electoral campaigning and deadline for CERA citizens to vote in a ballot box in the relevant consular office or division.
12 February: Official 24-hour ban on political campaigning prior to the general election (reflection day).
13 February: Polling day (polling stations open at 9 am and close at 8 pm or once voters present in a queue at/outside the polling station at 8 pm have cast their vote). Provisional counting of votes starts immediately.
16 February: General counting of votes, including the counting of CERA votes.
19 February: Deadline for the general counting of votes to be carried out by the relevant electoral commission.
28 February: Deadline for elected members to be proclaimed by the relevant electoral commission.
9 April: Final deadline for definitive results to be published in the BOCyL.

Campaign

Party slogans

Election debates
The electoral law of Castile and León provides for the presidential candidates of the parties having a parliamentary group in the Cortes to participate in, at least, two electoral debates to be held during the electoral campaign. Only the PSOE, PP and Cs had parliamentary groups going into the 2022 election, meaning that parties such as Podemos and Vox were excluded from participating.

Both debates were assigned to the regional broadcasting company (Radio Televisión de Castilla y León, RTVCyL) to be held on 31 January and 9 February. However, the national public broadcaster, RTVE, demanded to hold at least one of them. The regional electoral board conceded the first debate to RTVE. On 29 January, Cs's candidate Francisco Igea had a positive test for COVID-19, and requested a postponement of the debate. The electoral board decided that Igea would virtually attend the debate on 31 January while isolated.

Opinion polls
The tables below list opinion polling results in reverse chronological order, showing the most recent first and using the dates when the survey fieldwork was done, as opposed to the date of publication. Where the fieldwork dates are unknown, the date of publication is given instead. The highest percentage figure in each polling survey is displayed with its background shaded in the leading party's colour. If a tie ensues, this is applied to the figures with the highest percentages. The "Lead" column on the right shows the percentage-point difference between the parties with the highest percentages in a poll.

Graphical summary

Voting intention estimates
The table below lists weighted voting intention estimates. Refusals are generally excluded from the party vote percentages, while question wording and the treatment of "don't know" responses and those not intending to vote may vary between polling organisations. When available, seat projections determined by the polling organisations are displayed below (or in place of) the percentages in a smaller font; 41 seats were required for an absolute majority in the Cortes of Castile and León.

Voting preferences
The table below lists raw, unweighted voting preferences.

Victory preferences
The table below lists opinion polling on the victory preferences for each party in the event of a regional election taking place.

Victory likelihood
The table below lists opinion polling on the perceived likelihood of victory for each party in the event of a regional election taking place.

Preferred President
The table below lists opinion polling on leader preferences to become president of the Junta of Castile and León.

Voter turnout
The table below shows registered vote turnout on election day without including voters from the Census of Absent-Residents (CERA).

Results

Overall

Distribution by constituency

Aftermath

Although the PP emerged as the largest party in the election, their vote share and vote totals decreased from the 2019 election to their worst historical result in the region, despite early polls initially predicting a comfortable victory for the party, with close to a majority of seats in the regional parliament. Mañueco had been accused throughout the campaign of triggering the election in an attempt to emulate Isabel Díaz Ayuso's victory in the 2021 Madrilenian election. On election night, Vox's national leader Santiago Abascal proclaimed his candidate, Juan García-Gallardo, as the region's next vice president, while hinting that his party would not be satisfied with less power than was given to Cs following the 2019 government negotiations, and that Vox would not support Mañueco "for free".

Mañueco insisted in a PP minority government and warned Vox about "not taking a single step back" regarding women and LGBT rights. Prime Minister Pedro Sánchez suggested that PSOE would be willing to consider abstaining in favour of Mañueco's government to stop Vox having influence in the region, and he demanded that, for PSOE to support them, PP must explain why they did not want to rely on the far-right's support as well as terminating all PP–Vox agreements throughout Spain at all levels and forever.

In March 2022, PP and Vox formed a coalition government, with Vox taking three of ten ministerial positions including vice president for Juan García-Gallardo. Vox member Carlos Pollán was elected President of the Cortes of Castile and León, the position of speaker. The formation of the new government was endorsed by Alberto Núñez Feijóo, the sole candidate in the PP's upcoming leadership election, although he said he would not repeat it on the national level. Donald Tusk, leader of the European People's Party of which the Spanish party is a member, condemned the pact as "a sad surprise...I hope that it’s just an incident or accident, not a trend in Spanish politics".

Notes

References
Opinion poll sources

Other

Castile and León
Regional elections in Castile and León
February 2022 events in Spain